Thirza Eagle Nash (1885 – 1962) was a South African novelist who wrote about white settler life.

Life
Thirza Goch was born in Cape Colony, not far from the border with what would later be designated South West Africa. Her father was Willem Carel Goch, Wesleyan Minister and missionary at Leliefontein mission station, Namaqualand, and her mother was Louisa Anne Charleston. She studied at the Normal College of Pretoria, and married William Benjamin Nash in 1917. She accompanied her husband, a mining geologist, to frontier settlements in South West Africa.

Works
 Oh, Miss Maginty!, London: Hodder & Stoughton, 1920
 The Ex-Gentleman. London: Jarrolds, 1925
 "Detained at the Office", The 20-Story Magazine, Vol. 28. No. 168 (June 1936)
 The Geyer Brood. London: Cassell, 1946
 Witchweed. London: Cassell, 1947
 For Passion is Darkness. London: Cassell, 1951

References

Further reading
 Haarhoff, Dorian. "Emeralds, Ex-Gentlemen, Escom and Iscor: Frontier Literature in Namibia Circa 1925", English Studies in Africa 31 (1998), pp. 1–18
 Morgan, Lynda. "Illegitimate Bodies: Thirza Nash and the South African Settler Novel", PhD, School of Oriental and African Studies (University of London), 2003
 

1885 births
1962 deaths
South African women novelists
20th-century South African novelists
South African autobiographers
South African travel writers
Place of birth missing
University of Pretoria alumni
20th-century women writers
Women autobiographers